Yang Hee-seung ( born 1 March 1974) is a South Korean basketball player. He competed in the men's tournament at the 1996 Summer Olympics.

References

External links
 

1974 births
Living people
South Korean men's basketball players
Olympic basketball players of South Korea
Basketball players at the 1996 Summer Olympics
Place of birth missing (living people)